Stuart McGuire Flythe (December 5, 1911 – October 18, 1963) was an American Major League Baseball pitcher. He played for the Philadelphia Athletics during the  season.  He attended North Carolina State College, where he played college baseball for the Wolfpack.

References

External links

Major League Baseball pitchers
Philadelphia Athletics players
NC State Wolfpack baseball players
Baseball players from North Carolina
1911 births
1963 deaths
New Bern Bears players